AgDevCo is a social impact investor and project developer working in the African agriculture sector. The company supports small and medium-sized enterprises (SMEs) involved in farming, agriprocessing, and logistics, with the aim of creating jobs and income-earning opportunities for African farmers. With a portfolio of more than 50 debt and equity investments across ten countries (average investment size of USD3m), AgDevCo is one of the most active SME investors in the African agriculture sector. AgDevCo is backed by the UK government, and operates on a not-for-profit basis; all investment returns are recycled into new projects.

References

Social finance
Agriculture in Africa
Agricultural economics
Development organizations